Adelina is a genus of alveolates within the phylum Apicomplexa. They are coccidian parasites of arthropods and oligochaetes. Host orders include Coleoptera, Diptera, Collembola, Embioptera, Lepidoptera and Orthoptera.

Taxonomy
The genus was created by Hesse in 1911 to accommodate a number of species within the genus Adelea that differed significantly: the sporocysts in Adelina are fewer in number than in Adelea and are spherical instead of being discoidal. The type species is Adelina octospora .

Species

Description
Members of this genus have spherical or subspherical oocysts. The sporocysts are spherical and thick-walled.

References

Apicomplexa genera